Macho Fantastico is the second studio album by Finnish rapper Spekti. Released on 5 December 2014, the album peaked at number 18 on the Official Finnish Album Chart. The titular song, released as the lead single, peaked at number one on the Finnish Singles Chart in December 2014.

Track listing

Charts

Release history

References

2014 albums
Finnish-language albums